Ernst Pepping (12 September 1901 – 1 February 1981) was a German composer of classical music and academic teacher. He is regarded as an important composer of Protestant sacred music in the 20th century.

Career 
Born Ernst Heinrich Franz Pepping in Duisburg, Pepping first studied to be a teacher. From 1922 to 1926 he studied composition at the Berliner Hochschule für Musik with Walter Gmeindl, a pupil of Franz Schreker. Pepping composed mostly instrumental music until 1928. He received the composition award of the Mendelssohn Foundation. In 1929 his  (Chorale suite) was first performed in Duisburg and well received.

Among his many students were Helmut Barbe and Erhard Egidi. He had ties to the Confessing Church and wrote a great deal of music on German texts. In 1938, after a 1937 Church Music Festival in which he participated, he composed a German mass,  (German Mass: Kyrie God Father in Eternity), which stressed the German nation, and which also followed the Party line. During World War II, even during its final phase, Pepping was included in the  Gottbegnadeten list of artists deemed crucial to the art of the Third Reich, and was therefore exempted from military service.

Pepping taught again at the Berliner Hochschule from 1947 to 1968. He retired in 1968 and also stopped composing. He died in Spandau and is buried in Berlin's Friedhof Heerstraße Cemetery.

Composition 
Pepping is regarded as one of the most important composers of Protestant church music in the 20th century. He also composed secular vocal music, organ music, orchestral works including three symphonies, and chamber music. Pepping based his church music on Protestant hymns, the vocal polyphony of the 16th and 17th century and modal keys.

Pepping first wrote severe works with "uncompromising dissonance". On 30 October 1943 his Symphony No.2 in F minor was performed to great acclaim by the Berlin Philharmonic orchestra, conducted by Wilhelm Furtwangler, in Berlin.

Pepping's works were published by Schott.

Awards 
He was a member of the Academy of Arts, Berlin and the Bavarian Academy of Fine Arts, Munich.

11043 Pepping, minor planet.

Selected works 
 Three symphonies (recorded on cpo) 1932, 1942 (F minor), 1944 (E-flat)
 A piano concerto (1950)
 Variations for orchestra (pub. 1949)
  (1958)
 Masses, motets and other works for liturgical use including
  (1931)
 , motet (1936)
 , three motets from Leviticus (1937)
 , motet on gospel text (1938)
  (1938)
  (1948)
   for a cappella choir
 , a cappella choir (1959)
 , a cappella choir (1960)
 A setting of the Psalm 23 (published 1962)
 Organ works (a CD of which was released by cpo in 1992, including his second concerto for organ, the Chorale Partita,  on "", four fugues, and the partita  on "Ach wie flüchtig, ach wie nichtig")
 Organ Sonata (pub. 1958), other works
 Three Fugues on BACH (pub. 1949)
 : Advent & Christmas (pub. 1941)
 : Passion (pub. 1941)
 : Easter, Ascension, Pentecost, Michaelmas (pub. 1941)
  (pub. 1941)
 Piano works
 Sonatine (1931)
 Sonata for piano (pub. 1937)
 Songs
  for mezzo-soprano & piano (1946)
 Haus- und Trostbuch für Singstimme und Klavier (settings by Brentano, Goethe etc.) (1949)

Recordings 
Pepping's Symphony No. 2 in F minor was recorded live in Berlin on 30 October 1943 by the Berlin Philharmonic conducted by Wilhelm Furtwängler, remastered and reissued in 2007 by the Russian label Melodiya-Edition, the Soviets having taken the original tapes to Moscow in 1945. In 1990, organist Wolfgang Stockmeier played  (Organ works). The  (Passion report of Matthew) was performed in 1992 by the Danish National Radio Choir, conducted by Stefan Parkman. In 2002 the Sächsisches Vocalensemble performed the song cycle after Goethe  (Today and eternally). More  were recorded in 2005 by George Bozeman. All three symphonies and the piano concerto were recorded by the Nordwestdeutsche Philharmonie, conducted by Werner Andreas Albert with the pianist Volker Banfield in 2006.

References

Literature

External links 
 
 
 Der Nachlass von Ernst Pepping Staatsbibliothek Berlin
 Ernst Pepping / 12. September 1901 – 1. Februar 1981 Evangelische Kirche in Deutschland 2012

1901 births
1981 deaths
German classical composers
People from the Rhine Province
People from Duisburg
20th-century classical composers
Mendelssohn Prize winners
Berlin University of the Arts alumni
Academic staff of the Berlin University of the Arts
Members of the Academy of Arts, Berlin
German male classical composers
20th-century German composers
20th-century German male musicians